Wouter Jacobus Hanegraaff (born 10 April 1961) is full professor of History of Hermetic Philosophy and related currents at the University of Amsterdam, the Netherlands. He served as the first president of the European Society for the Study of Western Esotericism (ESSWE) from 2005 to 2013.

Life
Hanegraaff was raised as the son of a theologian. He originally studied classical guitar at the Municipal Conservatory at Zwolle from 1982 to 1987, and cultural history at the University of Utrecht from 1986 to 1990. From 1992 to 1996 he was a Research Fellow at the department for the Study of Religions at the University of Utrecht. From 1996 to 1999 Hanegraaff held a postdoctoral fellowship from the Dutch Association for Scientific Research (NWO), during which time he spent a period working in Paris. In 1999 he became professor of History of Hermetic Philosophy and Related Currents at the University of Amsterdam. From 2002 to 2006 he has been president of the Dutch Society for the Study of Religion, and, from 2005 to 2013, president of the European Society for the Study of Western Esotericism. In 2006 he was elected member of the Royal Netherlands Academy of Arts and Sciences, and he is now an honorary member of the ESSWE.

Partial bibliography

Monographs 
 -----New Age Religion and Western Culture: Esotericism in the Mirror of Secular Thought, Brill, Leiden 1996, State University of New York Press, Albany 1998. ; .
 ----- and R.M. Bouthoorn Lodovico Lazzarelli (1447–1500): The Hermetic Writings and Related Documents, Arizona Center for Medieval and Renaissance Studies, Tempe, 2005.
 -----Swedenborg, Oetinger, Kant: Three Perspectives on the Secrets of Heaven, The Swedenborg Foundation, West Chester, Pennsylvania 2007 (Swedenborg Studies Series, no. 18) .
 -----Esotericism and the Academy: Rejected Knowledge in Western Culture, Cambridge University Press, Cambridge 2012, .
 -----Western Esotericism: A Guide for the Perplexed, Bloomsbury, London 2013.
 -----Hermetic Spirituality and the Historical Imagination - Altered states of knowledge in late antiquity, Cambridge University Press, 2022. .

Edited volumes 
 (ed., with Peter J. Forshaw & Marco Pasi), Hermes Explains: Thirty Questions about Western Esotericism. Amsterdam University Press 2019, .   
 (ed., with Ria Kloppenborg), Female Stereotypes in Religious Traditions. Brill, Leiden 1995, .
 (ed., with Roelof van den Broek), Gnosis and Hermeticism from Antiquity to Modern Times. State University of New York Press, Albany 1998.
 (ed., with Antoine Faivre), Western Esotericism and the Science of Religion, Peeters, Louvain 1998.
 (ed., with Richard Caron, Joscelyn Godwin & Jean-Louis Vieillard-Baron), Ésotérisme, gnoses & imaginaire symbolique: Mélanges offerts à Antoine Faivre, Peeters, Louvain 2001.
 (ed.  in collaboration with Antoine Faivre, Roelof van den Broek, Jean-Pierre Brach, Dictionary of Gnosis and Western Esotericism, Brill, Leiden 2005. .
 (ed. with Jeffrey J. Kripal), Hidden Intercourse: Eros and Sexuality in the History of Western Esotericism. Brill, Leiden 2008.
 (ed. with Joyce Pijnenburg), Hermes in the Academy: Ten Years' Study of Western Esotericism at the University of Amsterdam. Amsterdam University Press, 2009.

See also
New Age

References

Footnotes

Sources

External links
 Wouter J. Hanegraaff Personal Website
 Personal Homepage at University of Amsterdam
 European Society for the Study of Western Esotericism

1961 births
Living people
20th-century Dutch philosophers
21st-century Dutch philosophers
Religion academics
New Age writers
Utrecht University alumni
Academic staff of the University of Amsterdam
Writers from Amsterdam
Western esotericism scholars
Members of the Royal Netherlands Academy of Arts and Sciences